The following events occurred in September 1953:

September 1, 1953 (Tuesday)
Air France Flight 178, a Lockheed L-749A Constellation (registration F-BAZZ) travelling to Nice, France, crashes into the side of Mount Cimet in the Maritime Alps 80 kilometers (50 miles) northeast of its destination. All 42 people on board are killed.
The world's first jet-to-jet aerial refueling takes place when a United States Air Force KB-47 Stratojet tanker refuels a B-47 Stratojet bomber.
 A charter flight operated by Regina Cargo Airlines in the United States involving a Douglas C-47K Skytrain (registration N19941) carrying military personnel from Fort Ord to McChord Air Force Base, crashes near Vail, Washington,killing all 21 occupants.
Died: Jacques Thibaud, 72, French violinist, killed in the crash of Air France Flight 178

September 2, 1953 (Wednesday)
Born: John Zorn, American composer and saxophonist, in New York City

September 3, 1953 (Thursday)
Born: Jean-Pierre Jeunet, French film director, in Roanne

September 4, 1953 (Friday)
 The discovery of Rapid eye movement sleep is first published by researchers Eugene Aserinsky and Nathaniel Kleitman.

September 5, 1953 (Saturday)
 The United Nations rejects the Soviet Union's proposal to accept China as a member.
Died: 
Constantin Levaditi, 79, Romanian physician and microbiologist
Clarrie Martin, 53, Australian politician, of a haemorrhage from a duodenal ulcer

September 6, 1953 (Sunday)
In the West German federal election, Chancellor Konrad Adenauer and his Christian Democratic Union retain power, governing in a broad coalition (two-thirds majority) with most of the minor parties.

September 7, 1953 (Monday)
 Nikita Khrushchev becomes head of the Soviet Central Committee.
Hurricane Carol causes the Panamanian cargo ship Eugenia to be driven ashore at Provincetown, Massachusetts, United States. The crew are taken off by means of a breeches buoy.
Cork defeat Galway in the final of the 1953 All-Ireland Senior Hurling Championship.
Died: Nobuyuki Abe, 77, Japanese politician, Prime Minister 1939-1940

September 8, 1953 (Tuesday)
The French ocean liner Liberté runs aground at Le Havre, but is refloated the same day.

September 9, 1953 (Wednesday)
The Ecuadorian naval yacht Esmereldas runs aground in the Guayas River; the vessel is a total loss.
Rumely v. United States: The US Supreme Court rules that indirect lobbying in the United States by distribution of books intended to influence opinion is a public good and not subject to regulation by Congress.

September 10, 1953 (Thursday)
The 1953 Tour de Hongrie cycle race concludes in Budapest and is won by József Kis-Dala of Hungary.

September 11, 1953 (Friday)
American soprano Helen Traubel begins performing in cabaret at Chicago nightclub Chez Paree. Later in the month she will leave the Metropolitan Opera, following an ultimatum from the manager of the Met, Rudolf Bing.

September 12, 1953 (Saturday)
 U.S. Senator John Fitzgerald Kennedy marries Jacqueline Lee Bouvier at St. Mary's Church in Newport, Rhode Island.

September 13, 1953 (Sunday)
The 1953 World Championship of Drivers ends with the Italian Grand Prix at Monza. The race is won by Juan Manuel Fangio of Argentina, but Alberto Ascari of Italy retains the championship.
Bob Trice becomes the first black player to play baseball for the Philadelphia Athletics side in the United States.

September 14, 1953 (Monday)

September 15, 1953 (Tuesday)

September 16, 1953 (Wednesday)
The Biblical epic film The Robe is released in the United States. It is the first film to be released in CinemaScope, a new widescreen format.
American Airlines Flight 723, a Convair CV-240-0, attempting to land in fog at Albany Airport, hits radio masts and crashes, killing all 28 people on board.

September 17, 1953 (Thursday)
US Navy Test pilot Scott Crossfield reaches Mach 1.85 at an altitude of 74,000 feet (22,555 m) in a Douglas Skyrocket.
Ernie Banks is introduced as the first African-American to play for the Chicago Cubs baseball team in the United States.

September 18, 1953 (Friday)
Died: Charles de Tornaco, 26, Belgian racing driver, in an accident during practice for the Modena Grand Prix

September 19, 1953 (Saturday)
Born: Wayne Clark, Australian Test cricketer, in Perth

September 20, 1953 (Sunday)
The 1953 Modena Grand Prix is won by Argentinian driver Juan Manuel Fangio. 
In the United States, the Chicago Aurora and Elgin Railroad ceases to operate into Chicago, the service now terminating at the Forest Park terminal.

September 21, 1953 (Monday)
A North Korean pilot, No Kum-Sok, defects to South Korea. He receives a reward that had been offered by the U.S. Far East Command for delivery of an intact MiG-15 fighter plane.
The Liberian-registered cargo ship  sinks in the Atlantic Ocean; one crew member is lost, and the other 25 people on board are rescued by the French ship .

September 22, 1953 (Tuesday)
In the Danish general election, the Social Democratic Party retains 74 of the 179 seats, remaining the largest in the Folketing
The Japanese tanker Eiho Maru runs aground three times in the River Mersey, United Kingdom.
Born: Ségolène Royal, French politician and presidential candidate, at the military base of Ouakam, Dakar, French West Africa (Senegal)

September 23, 1953 (Wednesday)
 Francoist Spain and the United States of America sign the Pact of Madrid, ending a period of virtual isolation for Spain.

September 24, 1953 (Thursday)
US boxer Rocky Marciano retains his World Heavyweight title by defeating another American, Roland La Starza, when their New York City bout is stopped in the 11th round.
Died: Jacobo Fitz-James Stuart, 17th Duke of Alba, 74, Spanish aristocrat, diplomat, politician, art collector and Olympic sportsman

September 25, 1953 (Friday)
 Typhoon Tess makes landfall in Japan and kills at least 393 people.
 Primate of Poland Stefan Wyszyński, imprisoned by the Communist government, is placed under house arrest in Rywałd.

September 26, 1953 (Saturday)
 Rationing of raw sugar ends in the UK.

September 27, 1953 (Sunday)
RecordTV is launched in Brazil. A free-to-air television network, it becomes the first official regular broadcasting service in Sao Paulo.

September 28, 1953 (Monday)
Resort Airlines Flight 1081, a Curtiss C-46F-1-CU Commando (registration N66534) – crashes on approach to Standiford Field in Louisville, Kentucky, United States. The crash and resultant fire kill 25 of the 41 people on board.
Died: Edwin Hubble, 63, US astronomer, of cerebral thrombosis

September 29, 1953 (Tuesday)
The British Royal Navy destroyer  runs aground in the North Sea off Cromer, Norfolk, England, but is later refloated.
Died: Ernst Reuter, 64, German politician and incumbent Mayor of West Berlin, of a heart attack. US President Eisenhower refers to him as "a rare combination of talents".

September 30, 1953 (Wednesday)
Social Democrat leader Hans Hedtoft replaces Erik Eriksen as Prime Minister of Denmark.
The US fishing vessel Sortland is destroyed by fire at Driftwood Bay on the coast of the Kenai Peninsula in the Territory of Alaska.
The decommissioned US Navy frigate  is sunk as a torpedo target.

References

1953
1953-09
1953-09